Yulenmis Aguilar Martínez (born 3 August 1996 in Bayamo) is a Cuban track and field athlete, specialising in the javelin throw.

She competed at the 2015 World Championships in Beijing without qualifying for the final. In the Pan American Junior Edmonton 2015 he launched 63.86 which is the current Junior world record]].
 
Her personal best in the event is 64.17 metres, set in Spain in 2022.

Competition record

References

External links
http://results.toronto2015.org/IRS/en/athletics/athlete-profile-n10155605-aguilar-yulenmis.htm
http://www.espn.co.uk/olympics/summer/2016/athletes/_/athlete/54981
https://www.youtube.com/watch?v=Eu8vAvn1cng

Cuban female javelin throwers
Living people
People from Granma Province
1996 births
World Athletics Championships athletes for Cuba
Athletes (track and field) at the 2015 Pan American Games
Athletes (track and field) at the 2016 Summer Olympics
Olympic athletes of Cuba
Central American and Caribbean Games bronze medalists for Cuba
Competitors at the 2014 Central American and Caribbean Games
Competitors at the 2018 Central American and Caribbean Games
Central American and Caribbean Games medalists in athletics
Pan American Games competitors for Cuba
21st-century Cuban women